Federico Casarini (born 7 September 1989) is an Italian footballer. He plays for  side Avellino.

Career
Casarini made his Serie A debut for Bologna in a 2–1 victory away to Catania, on 18 January 2009. On 1 September 2010, Casarini signed a new 5-year contract worth €250,000 a season (€447,258 in gross)

On 16 September 2015 Casarini was signed by Serie B newcomer Novara Calcio. He took no.7 shirt from Dario Bergamelli, who left for Catania on the same day.

On 26 August 2019, he signed a 3-year contract with Serie C club Alessandria.

On 18 August 2022, Casarini joined Avellino.

References

External links
 
Bologna F.C. 1909 Official Player Profile 
Federico Casarini National Team Stats at FIGC.it  

1989 births
Sportspeople from Carpi, Emilia-Romagna
Living people
Italian footballers
Italy youth international footballers
Bologna F.C. 1909 players
Cagliari Calcio players
S.S. Virtus Lanciano 1924 players
Novara F.C. players
Ascoli Calcio 1898 F.C. players
U.S. Alessandria Calcio 1912 players
U.S. Avellino 1912 players
Serie A players
Serie B players
Serie C players
Association football midfielders
Footballers from Emilia-Romagna